Samuel Murphey Bason (December 3, 1894 – January 15, 1986) was an American politician. He served as a Democratic member for the 15th district of the North Carolina Senate.

Bason was born in Swepsonville, North Carolina, the son of Flora Murphey and William Henry Bason. He attended Burlington High School, Oak Ridge Military Academy and the University of North Carolina at Chapel Hill. He served in the United States Army during World War I.

In 1947, he won the election for the 15th district of the North Carolina Senate, and served for the 15th district until 1959. He worked as a banker in Yanceyville, North Carolina and was an elder of the Yanceyville Presbyterian Church.

Bason died in January 1986 at the Roman Eagle Memorial Home in Danville, Virginia, at the age of 91. He was buried in the Yanceyville Presbyterian Church cemetery.

References 

1894 births
1986 deaths
People from Swepsonville, North Carolina
People from Alamance County, North Carolina
People from Caswell County, North Carolina
Democratic Party North Carolina state senators
20th-century American politicians
American bankers
Oak Ridge Military Academy alumni
University of North Carolina at Chapel Hill alumni
Burials in North Carolina
Long family
American military personnel of World War I
United States Army soldiers